Mary Elizabeth Coleman is an American politician, attorney, and pro-life activist from Arnold, Missouri. She has served in the Missouri Senate since 2023, representing the 22nd district. Coleman was previously a state representative from 2019 to 2023 and a Arnold city councilwoman from 2013 to 2015.

Early life and education 
Coleman was raised in Georgetown, Texas. She earned a Bachelor of Science in Business Administration from Saint Louis University and a Juris Doctor from St. Mary's University School of Law.

Career 
From 2007 to 2009, Coleman worked as an associate at Oppenheimer, Blend, Harrison and Tate. She was then a member of the Arnold, Missouri City Council. Coleman operated an independent law firm from 2009 to 2015 and joined TuckerAllen in 2015. Coleman has also worked for the Thomas More Society, an anti-abortion law firm.

Arnold City Council
On April 2, 2013, Coleman won an open seat on the Arnold, Missouri City Council, representing the 2nd ward. Her term began on April 11. She did not run for re-election in 2015.

Missouri House of Representatives
In March 2018, Coleman announced her campaign for the Missouri House of Representatives in the 97th district. The seat was considered competitive after Democrat Mike Revis flipped it from the Republicans in a February 2018 special election.

In the House, Coleman served as chair of the House Children and Families Committee. In December 2021, Coleman introduced a bill that would ban abortion in Missouri after eight weeks, modeled after the Texas Heartbeat Act. In 2022, Coleman proposed that Missouri women who leave the state to get an abortion should be prohibited from doing so.

Missouri Senate 
In February 2021, Coleman declared her candidacy for a seat in the Missouri Senate. She came in first place against three opponents in the Republican primary, and then won the general election of 2022.

References 

Living people
People from Georgetown, Texas
Saint Louis University alumni
St. Mary's University School of Law alumni
People from Arnold, Missouri
Republican Party members of the Missouri House of Representatives
Year of birth missing (living people)
Women state legislators in Missouri